Vitali Teleš (born 17 October 1983 in Tallinn) is an Estonian footballer who plays for Estonian club Maardu Linnameeskond as a goalkeeper.

Club career

TVMK Tallinn
After TVMK was disbanded Teleš was about to retire of professional football and return to TJK as an amateur, but then got a chance to play in Finnish Veikkausliiga for FF Jaro.

FF Jaro
He made his league debut for FF Jaro on 31 May 2009 in a 5–1 win against JJK.

JK Nõmme Kalju
On 23 January 2012, it was announced that Teleš had signed a one-year contract with JK Nõmme Kalju. He made the league debut for the club on 10 March 2012, in a goalless draw against city rivals FC Levadia Tallinn. In September 2012, he signed a new contract until the end of 2014 season. Teleš was one of three players to play every single minute of the 2012 league season, others being teammate Ken Kallaste and JK Sillamäe Kalev goalkeeper Mihhail Starodubtsev. He repeated the feat in the next season.

References

External links
 
 Player profile at Veikkausliiga

1983 births
Footballers from Tallinn
Living people
Estonian footballers
FC TVMK players
Estonian expatriate footballers
FF Jaro players
Nõmme Kalju FC players
Meistriliiga players
Veikkausliiga players
Expatriate footballers in Finland
Estonian expatriate sportspeople in Finland
Association football goalkeepers
Maardu Linnameeskond players